β-Cyclodextrin sometimes abbreviated as β-CD, is a heptasaccharide derived from glucose. The α- (alpha), β- (beta), and γ- (gamma) cyclodextrins correspond to six, seven, and eight glucose units, respectively. β-Cyclodextrin is the most used natural cyclodextrin in marketed medicines.  The reason for this lies in the ease of its production and subsequent low price (more than 10,000 tons produced annually with an average bulk price of approximately 5 USD per kg).

Structure

In β-cyclodextrin, the seven glucose subunits are linked end to end via α-1,4 linkages.  The result has the shape of a tapered cylinder, with seven primary alcohols on one face and fourteen secondary alcohol groups on the other. The exterior surface of cyclodextrins is somewhat hydrophilic whereas the interior core is hydrophobic.

Physical properties
β-Cyclodextrin exists as a white (colorless) powder or crystals. The density of its saturated hydrate crystal (βCD·12H2O) is 1.46 g/cm3.  β-Cyclodextrin is moderately soluble in water and glycerin; well soluble in dimethyl sulfoxide, dimethylformamide, pyridine, HFIP, and ethylene glycol; and insoluble in ethanol and acetone.

Applications
The cavity diameter of β-cyclodextrins is well-suited for use with molecules the size of various biomolecules. For this reason, β-cyclodextrin is most commonly used as a complexing agent. β-Cyclodextrin is widely used in medicine, pharmacy, food industry, textiles.

Derivatives
While as β-cyclodextrin has rather poor solubility, industry uses its derivatives with much better solubility. Most applied derivatives are: 2-hydroxypropyl-β-cyclodextrin (HPbCD), randomly methylated β-cyclodextrin (RAMEB), and β-cyclodextrin sulfobutyl ether sodium salt (SBEbCD). All these derivatives have solubility more than 500 mg/mL.

References

Oligosaccharides
Starch
Macrocycles
Chelating agents
E-number additives